William Dennison or Denison may refer to:
 William Dennison (academic), 18th-century Master of University College, Oxford
 William Dennison Jr. (1815–1882), American politician, Governor of Ohio and U.S. Postmaster General
 William Dennison (Canadian politician) (1905–1981), Mayor of Toronto, Member of Provincial Parliament
 William Neil Dennison (1841–1904), American Civil War artillery officer
 William Denison (1804–1871), British colonial official, Governor of New South Wales, 1855–1861, and Governor of Madras, 1861–1866
 William Denison, 1st Earl of Londesborough (1834–1900), British peer and Liberal politician
 William Denison (cricketer) (1801–1856), English cricketer and cricket official
 William Evelyn Denison (1843–1916), British Member of Parliament for Nottingham, 1874–1880
 William Kendall Denison (1869–?), American classicist, and educator
 William S. Denison (1794–1880), Baptist farmer; benefactor and namesake of Denison University in Ohio
 William Joseph Denison (1770–1849), English banker and politician
 William Beckett-Denison (1826–1890), English banker and Conservative politician
 Doug Dennison (William Douglas Dennison, born 1951), American football player

See also
 William Dennison Cary (1808–?), founder of Cary, Illinois